"Starting Over" is a song written by Bob McDill, recorded by American country music artist Tammy Wynette. It was released in March 1980 as the second single from the album Only Lonely Sometimes.

Background and reception
"Starting Over" was recorded in January 1980 at the Columbia Recording Studio in Nashville, Tennessee. The session featured tracks that would later appear on Wynette's 1980 album. The recording session was produced by Billy Sherrill and included renowned Nashville session musicians such as Johnny Gimble, Pete Drake and George Richey (Wynette's husband).

The song reached number 17 on the Billboard Hot Country Singles chart. It released on her 1980 studio album Only Lonely Sometimes.

Track listings
7" vinyl single
 "Starting Over" – 3:07
 "I'll Be Thinking of You" – 3:58

Charts

Weekly charts

References 

1980 songs
1980 singles
Epic Records singles
Tammy Wynette songs
Song recordings produced by Billy Sherrill
Songs written by Bob McDill